Anston is an unincorporated community located in the town of Pittsfield, in Brown County, Wisconsin, United States. It is located at latitude 44.617 and longitude -88.16; its elevation is 748 feet above mean sea level.

History
Anston was named for a family of settlers.

Notes

Unincorporated communities in Brown County, Wisconsin
Unincorporated communities in Wisconsin
Green Bay metropolitan area